Warren Noble (1885–1950) was a British-born American automotive engineer and inventor, the inventor of an electric stove.

References 

1885 births
1950 deaths
American automotive engineers